La nouvelle internationale ('The New International') was a weekly newspaper published from Geneva, Switzerland between May 1, 1917 and April 1921. The newspaper was founded by Charles Hubacher and Henri Guilbeaux as a successor of Le Peuple suisse. La nouvelle internationale was based on the principles of the Zimmerwald Left. It carried the byline 'Newspaper of the internationalist socialist workers'. Apart from Hubacher, another notable editor was Ernest Brunner. On May 1, 1921 La nouvelle internationale was superseded by l'Avant-garde.

References

1917 establishments in Switzerland
1921 disestablishments in Switzerland
Communist newspapers
Defunct newspapers published in Switzerland
Defunct weekly newspapers
French-language newspapers published in Switzerland
Newspapers published in Geneva
Publications established in 1917
Publications disestablished in 1921
Weekly newspapers published in Switzerland